Be My Love is a song popularized by Mario Lanza.

Be My Love may also refer to:

Be My Love, album by Plácido Domingo
Be My Love, album by Joseph Calleja
"Be My Love", a song by Exo-CBX, a sub-unit of the South Korean boy band Exo